Giorgio Cavallon  (March 3, 1904 – December 22, 1989) was a founding member of the American Abstract Artists and a pioneer Abstract Expressionist.

Biography
Giorgio Cavallon was born March 3, 1904, in Sorio, a hamlet of the municipality of Gambellara near Vicenza Italy and immigrated to the US in 1920. He became a US citizen in 1929.

In 1926, Cavallon studied at the National Academy of Design, New York City.  In 1927 and 1928, he studied with Charles Hawthorne, Provincetown, Massachusetts, and from 1934, he studied during the evening with Hans Hofmann's School of Fine Art.

Career
In 1934, Cavallon was employed in the Works Progress Administration/Federal Art Project (WPA/FAP) Easel & Mural Division as Arshile Gorky's assistant.

In 1936, Cavallon joined other like-minded artists in founding the American Abstract Artists group. This major movement of abstract art in America began in the 1930s with a strong direction toward an emphasis in structural quality in art. Juan Gris statement sums up the movement:

Artists have thought to produce a poetic effect with a beautiful model or beautiful subjects. We on the other hand believe that we can produce it with beautiful elements, for those of the intellect are certainly the most beautiful.
By the end of the 1940s Giorgio Cavallon connected to the early generation of New York School Abstract Expressionist artists whose artistic innovation by the 1950s had been recognized across the Atlantic, including Paris.

In 1949, Cavallon joined the "Artists' Club" located at 39 East 8th Street. He was chosen by his fellow artists to show in the Ninth Street Show held on May 21-June 10, 1951. The show was located at 60 East 9th Street on the first floor and the basement of a building which was about to be demolished.
  
The artists celebrated not only the appearance of the dealers, collectors and museum people on the 9th Street, and the consequent exposure of their work but they celebrated the creation and the strength of a living community of significant dimensions.

He participated from 1951 to 1957 in the invitational New York Painting and Sculpture Annuals including the Ninth Street Show. He was among the 24 out of a total 256 New York School artists who was included in all the Annuals. These Annuals were important because the participants were chosen by the artists themselves.

Cavallon died on December 22, 1989, at New York Hospital. He was 85 years old and lived in Manhattan.

Selected solo exhibitions
1932: Bottega d'Arte, Venice, Italy
1934: A.C.A. Gallery, New York City
1940: Eight Street Playhouse Gallery, New York City
1946, 1948: Eagen Gallery, New York City
1957: Stable Gallery, New York City
1963: Kootz Gallery, New York City
1964: Weatherspoon Gallery, University of North Carolina at Greensboro, North Carolina
1971, 1976: A.M. Sachs Gallery, New York City
1977: Neuberger Museum, Purchase, New York City
1977, 1981, 1986: Gruenebaum Gallery, New York City
1989: Paintings from the 1960s, Jason McCoy, Inc., New York City
1989: Manny Silverman Gallery, Los Angeles, California
1990: A Retrospective View, William Benton Museum of Art, University of Connecticut, Storrs, Connecticut

Selected public collections
 Albright-Knox Art Gallery, Buffalo, New York
 Chase Manhattan Bank, New York City, New York
 Fogg Museum, Harvard University Art Museums, Cambridge, Massachusetts
 Grey Art Gallery, New York University, Manhattan, New York
 Rhode Island School of Design, Providence, Rhode Island
 Prudential Insurance Company of America, Newark, New Jersey
 Singer Manufacturing Co., New York City, New York
 The Bank of New York, New York City, New York
 Museum of Modern Art, New York City, New York
 The Solomon R. Guggenheim Museum, New York City, New York
 Whitney Museum of American Art, New York City, New York
 University Art Museum, Berkeley, California

References

External links for images
Giorgio Cavallon on artnet
American Abstract Artists

See also
Art movement
Abstract Imagists
Abstract expressionism
New York School
Action painting
Ninth Street Show

1904 births
1989 deaths
Abstract expressionist artists
Italian emigrants to the United States
20th-century American painters
American male painters
Federal Art Project artists
Modern painters
Painters from New York City
20th-century American male artists
Members of the American Academy of Arts and Letters